The 1896 FA Cup final was the 25th. edition of the FA Cup finals, belonging to the 1895–96 FA Cup. It was won by The Wednesday at the Crystal Palace, in a victory over Wolverhampton Wanderers.

Tournament format 
Clubs competed for a new trophy, which remains the oldest surviving FA Cup trophy, although it was retired from use in 1910.

Route to the Final

The Wednesday
Round 1: Southampton St. Mary's 2–3 The Wednesday

Round 2: The Wednesday 2–1 Sunderland

Quarter-final: The Wednesday 4–0 Everton

Semi-final: The Wednesday 1–1 Bolton Wanderers
(at Goodison Park)
Replay: Bolton Wanderers 1–3 The Wednesday
(at Nottingham Forest)

Wolverhampton Wanderers
Round 1: Wolverhampton Wanderers 2–2 Notts County
Replay: Notts County 3–4 Wolverhampton Wanderers

Round 2: Wolverhampton Wanderers 2–0 Liverpool

Quarter-final: Wolverhampton Wanderers 3–0 Stoke City

Semi-final: Wolverhampton Wanderers 2–1 Derby County
(at Villa Park)

Match 

Fred Spiksley became the star of the show in this Cup Final, scoring the two goals that gave the Wednesday a 2–1 win. Within the first minute, a run by Harry Davis, the outside-right, set up Spiksley to slot home the first. David Black soon equalised for Wolves with a cunning hook close to the post. Spiksley however smashed a shot against the upright which bounced into the goal and then out again. The referee gave a goal. The score stayed the same until the final whistle to give Wednesday their first FA Cup win.

Match details

References

External links 
Match report

1896
1895–96 in English football
Sheffield Wednesday F.C. matches
Wolverhampton Wanderers F.C. matches
April 1896 sports events
1896 sports events in London